Woodlawn, also known as Wiltshire House or Wiltshire Farm, was built circa 1820, one of four homes within a two-mile radius by James Hurst, a significant landowner in Jefferson County.  Hurst built the first three houses for his children on his "LaGrange" plantation around 1811, including "Snow Hill' (now known as the Jefferson County Alms House (c. 1815) and the Coyle House (c. 1820).  Woodlawn was built for the adopted daughter of Samuel Davenport, whose married name was Camilla Wiltshire.  All of these homes used salt-glazed brick, as did Elmwood and the Tate-Fairfax-Muse House.

References

Houses on the National Register of Historic Places in West Virginia
Houses in Jefferson County, West Virginia
Federal architecture in West Virginia
Houses completed in 1820
National Register of Historic Places in Jefferson County, West Virginia